Conflans–Fin d'Oise is a railway station serving Conflans-Sainte-Honorine. It is a two-level station situated on 

the lines from Saint-Lazare to Cergy-le-Haut and from Saint-Lazare to Mantes-la-Jolie via Conflans-sainte-Honorine.

Frequentation of the station 
The lower station (RER A and Transilien L) of Conflans-Fin-d'Oise welcomed nearly 9,500 passengers per day in 2009. In 2012, 1860 passengers took the train to the train station (Transilien J) every week.

Photo gallery

See also

 List of stations of the Paris RER
 RER A
 Transilien Paris-Saint-Lazare

References

External links
 

Railway stations in Yvelines
Railway stations in France opened in 1985